Tommaso Maria Martinelli (4 February 1827  - 30 March 1888) was a Cardinal of the Roman Catholic Church who served as Prefect of the Congregation of Rites.

Tommaso Martinelli was born in the parish of Sant'Anna, Lucca as the son of Cosma Martinelli and Maddalena Pardini.  He was the brother of Cardinal Sebastiano Martinelli.

Education 
He entered the Order of Hermits of Saint Augustine (Augustinians) in Lucca in 1842 and was professed on 19 April 1844.

Priesthood 
He was ordained on 22 December 1849 in Rome. He was lecturer in the monastery and college of St Augustine, Rome and served as regent of studies of the school in September 1855.  He became assistant professor of  Scripture at La Sapienza University in Rome in 1856. He was full professor from 1862 to 1870. He visited Belgium, the Netherlands, Ireland, Bavaria and Bohemia with the superior general of the order in 1862. He was consultor of the Congregation of the Index in 1864. He was a theologian at the First Vatican Council from 1869 to 1870.

Cardinalate 
He was created Cardinal-Deacon of S. Giorgio in Velabro by Pope Pius IX in the consistory of 22 December 1873.  He was appointed as Prefect of the Congregation of Studies on 12 March 1874.  He opted for the order of cardinal priests and the title of Santa Prisca on 17 September 1875. He was appointed as Prefect of the Congregation of Rites on 18 October 1877. He participated in the conclave of 1878 that elected Pope Leo XIII.  He remained at the Congregation for Rites until he was appointed as Prefect of the Congregation of the Index on 15 July 1878.  He served as Camerlengo of the Sacred College of Cardinals from 15 March 1883 until 24 March 1884.

Episcopate 
He opted for the order of cardinal bishops, taking the suburbicarian see of Sabina on 24 March 1884.

Death 
He died in 1888, at 6:45 a.m. in Rome, after a brief illness. His body was exposed in the church of S. Agostino, Rome, where the funeral took place on 4 April at 10 a.m.  The final absolution was imparted by Cardinal Carlo Sacconi, Dean of the Sacred College of Cardinals; eighteen cardinals were also in attendance; the remains were buried in the chapel of his order in the Campo Verano cemetery.

References

1827 births
1888 deaths
19th-century Italian cardinals
Cardinals created by Pope Pius IX
Cardinal-bishops of Sabina